Barton Harvey (13 February 1922 – 29 February 2008) was an Australian sailor. He competed in the Star event at the 1952 Summer Olympics.

References

External links
 

1922 births
2008 deaths
Australian male sailors (sport)
Olympic sailors of Australia
Sailors at the 1952 Summer Olympics – Star
Place of birth missing